Chechen State University (Russian: Чеченский государственный университет) is a university located in Grozny, Chechnya, Russia. The school is home to the North Caucasian Centre of Pedagogics. The university traces its roots back to 1938.

History

Soviet period
Chechen State University, formerly Grozney University, saw a surge of development between 1970 and 1980. Botanical gardens were built in the mountainous areas of the Chechen Republic. Technologies developed at the university were used in aviation design for Tupolev, and many of the university's scientific discoveries were displayed at the All-Union Agricultural Exhibition of the USSR and at international exhibitions. Regional scientific conferences were held on campus, including the All-Union Agricultural Exhibition.

After the Chechen War
Military activity in the Chechen Republic during the Second Chechen War interrupted the development of Grozny University and destroyed several buildings. The university began restoration soon after the end of military operations and classes resumed in April 2000. Classrooms, laboratories, reading rooms and the scientific library were repaired. A new sports centre was one of the last projects to be completed. Much of the work was carried out by students and employees.

Over 800 instructors currently work at the school's campus. Chechen State University is a large scientific and educational centre for the Chechen Republic.

Notable alumni
 Magomed Bibulatov (Law Faculty) -  professional MMA contender for the UFC

References

External links
  Chechen State University official website

Education in Chechnya
Universities in Russia
Public universities and colleges in Russia
Educational institutions established in 1938
Buildings and structures in Grozny
1938 establishments in the Soviet Union